National Route 233 is a national highway of Japan connecting Asahikawa and Ruomi in Hokkaido, with a total length of 78.3 km (48.65 mi).

References

National highways in Japan
Roads in Hokkaido